Youyi Road station is a subway station in Tianxin District, Changsha, Hunan, China, operated by the Changsha subway operator Changsha Metro. It entered revenue service on June 28, 2016.

History 
The station opened on 28 June 2016.

Layout

Surrounding area
Yongxi Building
Hunan Taxation Bureau
Hunan Construction Engineering Group Corporation

References

Railway stations in Hunan
Railway stations in China opened in 2016